The Juno Awards of 1976, representing Canadian music industry achievements of the previous year, were awarded on 15 March 1976 in Toronto at a ceremony hosted by John Allan Cameron at the Ryerson Polytechnical Institute auditorium. CBC Television provided a national broadcast of the ceremonies.

Randy Bachman presented a special "people's award" to Juno founder Walt Grealis on this occasion compared to the lack of mention of Grealis at last year's ceremonies.

Dan Hill performed "You Make Me Want To Be" at the ceremonies.

Nominees and winners

Female Vocalist of the Year
Winner: Joni Mitchell

Male Vocalist of the Year
Winner: Gino Vannelli

Most Promising Female Vocalist of the Year
Winner: Patricia Dahlquist

Most Promising Male Vocalist of the Year
Winner: Dan Hill

Group of the Year
Winner: Bachman–Turner Overdrive

Most Promising Group of the Year
Winner: Myles and Lenny
Aut'Chose
Bond
Heart
Maneige

Composer of the Year
Winner: Hagood Hardy, "The Homecoming"

Country Female Vocalist of the Year
Winner: Anne Murray

Country Male Vocalist of the Year
Winner: Murray McLauchlan

Country Group or Duo of the Year
Winner: The Mercey Brothers

Folk Singer of the Year
Winner: Gordon Lightfoot

Instrumental Artist of the Year
Winner: Hagood Hardy

Recording Engineer of the Year
Winner: Michel Ethier, Dompierre by François Dompierre

People's award
Winner: Walt Grealis

Nominated and winning albums

Best Selling Album
Winner: Four Wheel Drive, Bachman–Turner Overdrive

Best Album Graphics
Winner:  Bart Schoales, Joy Will Find a Way by Bruce Cockburn

Best Selling International Album
Winner: Greatest Hits, Elton John

Nominated and winning releases

Best Selling Single
Winner: "You Ain't Seen Nothing Yet", Bachman–Turner Overdrive
Paul Anka, "I Don't Like to Sleep Alone"
Hagood Hardy, "The Homecoming"
The Stampeders, "Hit the Road Jack"

Best Selling International Single
Winner: "Love Will Keep Us Together", The Captain and Tennille

References

External links
Juno Awards site

1976
1976 music awards
1976 in Canadian music